Rebuck is an unincorporated community in Northumberland County, Pennsylvania, United States. Rebuck has a post office, with ZIP code 17867.

References

Unincorporated communities in Northumberland County, Pennsylvania
Unincorporated communities in Pennsylvania